Ernestine Hill (21 January 1899 — 21 August 1972) was an Australian journalist, travel writer and novelist.

Life
Born Mary Ernestine Hemmings in Rockhampton, Queensland, she attended All Hallows' School in Brisbane, and then Stott & Hoare's Business College, Brisbane. On completing her studies, she worked briefly in the public service, and then for Smith's Weekly, Sydney, first as the secretary to the literary editor, J. F. Archibald, and later as a journalist and subeditor.

In 1924 her son Robert was born. Rumoured to be R.C. Packer's son, although never publicly acknowledged. Ernestine assumed the surname Hill. During the 1930s she travelled extensively around Australia, writing as she went, primarily for Associated Newspapers. Hill then worked for the ABC from 1940 from 1944, on the A.B.C. Weekly and as a commissioner.

After resigning from the ABC, she resumed her travels, but published little from her work during this period. She was awarded a Commonwealth Literary Fund fellowship in 1959. However, while this provided her with a small pension, her final years were characterised by financial and health problems. She died in Brisbane in 1972.

Writing career
The majority of her writing, which comprised books as well as articles for newspapers and such journals as Walkabout, resulted from her wide travels across Australia. They recorded her adventures and focus on the Australian landscape. She could also be controversial. For example, her reporting of a gold strike at the Granites in the Northern Territory in 1931 contributed to financial ruin for some and was branded irresponsible.

She is best known for The Territory. However, her only novel, My Love Must Wait, a fictionalised biography of sailor and navigator Matthew Flinders, sold well overseas as well as in Australia. During the 1930s she formed a friendship with Daisy Bates and later claimed to be mostly responsible for Daisy Bates' The Passing of the Aborigines, although this is a contentious issue. AustLit: The Australian Literature Resource claims that Bates eventually confirmed that Hill did ghost-write the book.

Works

Non-fiction
 The Great Australian Loneliness (London: 1937; Australia:1940)
 Water into Gold (1937)
 Australia: Land of Contrasts (1943)
 Flying Doctor Calling (1947)
 The Territory (1951)
 Kabbarli: A Personal Memoir of Daisy Bates (1973)

Fiction
 My Love Must Wait (1941)

Radio plays
Santa Clause of Christmas Creek in Australian Radio Plays (1946)

See also
 Australian outback literature of the 20th century

References

Further reading
 Debra Adelaide, Australian Women Writers: A Bibliographic Guide, London, Pandora, 1988.
 Marianne van Velzen, Call of the Outback: The Remarkable Story of Ernestine Hill, Nomad, Adventurer and Trailblazer, Crows Nest, N.S.W., Allen & Unwin, 2016.
 Eleanor Hogan, 'Into the Loneliness: The Unholy Alliance of Ernestine Hill and Daisy Bates'. Sydney: NewSouth Publishing. 2021.

External links
Ernestine Hill papers (UQFL18) held at Fryer Library, The University of Queensland Library, and digitised material from collection. 
Ernestine Hill AustLit entry

1899 births
1972 deaths
Australian travel writers
Australian women writers
People from Rockhampton
Women travel writers
20th-century Australian journalists
19th-century Australian women
20th-century Australian women
People educated at All Hallows' School